This article lists the heads of government of the Raj of Sarawak from 1843 to 1946, when the Raj of Sarawak was ceded to the United Kingdom and became the Crown Colony of Sarawak.

List

(Dates in italics indicate de facto continuation of office)

See also
 White Rajahs
 Raj of Sarawak
 History of Sarawak

References

External links

Government of Sarawak
History of Sarawak
Sarawak